There are 92 listed buildings (Swedish: byggnadsminne) in Blekinge County, Sweden.

Karlshamn Municipality

Karlskrona Municipality

Olofström Municipality

Ronneby Municipality

Sölvesborg Municipality

External links

  Bebyggelseregistret

Listed buildings in Sweden